The Judiciary of Kiribati  is the branch of the Government of Kiribati which interprets and applies the laws of the country. In addition to the Constitution of Kiribati and the corpus of laws, the laws of Kiribati include customary law, which the courts must take into account when considering specified matters in criminal and civil proceedings.

Courts

Magistrate courts
Some 24 Magistrates' court, composed of Magistrates and a clerk, deal with less-serious civil, criminal, and land cases on a district basis. Magistrates courts are district courts of summary jurisdiction and were formally established by the Magistrates Courts Ordinance of 1977. They are by default composed of 3 magistrates appointed by the Minister of Justice on recommendation of the Chief Justice of the High Court, however, the Chief Justice may establish single magistrate units of which there are currently 11 operating on the islands of South Tarawa and Kiritimati.

High Court
The High Court hears more serious civil and criminal cases appealed to it by the Magistrates courts. It along with the Court of Appeal is constitutionally established as Kiribati's superior court of record. Appeals relating to land, divorce, and inheritance are dealt with by the High Court's Land Division. Prior to 2014 there was only the one High Court judge, but in that year a second (puisne) judge was appointed. The Chief Justice of Kiribati is the Head of the Judiciary in Kiribati and is appointed by the President of Kiribati on advice from the Cabinet in consultation with the Public Service Commmission. Additional judges are appointed by the President on advice from the Chief Justice in consultation with the Public Service Commission. Only a person who has held office as a judge (in any country) or who has been qualified to practice law for at least 5 years are eligible to be appointed to the High Court.

Court of Appeal
Kiribati Court of Appeal is established to hear appeals from the High Court. The court is composed of the Chief Justice and other judges of the High Court, and other such justices appointed by the President on advice of the Chief Justice of the High Court sitting with the Public Service Commission. Judges appointed to the court in addition to the High Court judges may sit on the Court of Appeal for a specified term or for particular causes or matters. The President chooses which judge shall sit as President of the Court of Appeals. A Court of Appeal judge may not sit for an appeal for a case in which they gave a decision on any court on which they were a member. 

Judges may only be removed if they are unable to carry out the functions of the office, or for "misbehavior" as decided by the President on resolution by the Maneaba ni Maungatabu after advice from a tribunal appointed by the President, one of whose members must be a person who has held "high judicial office."

Chief Justices
From 1877 to 1962, the Chief Justice of Fiji was ex officio the Chief Judicial Commissioner for the Western Pacific including the Gilbert Islands (as Gilbert and Ellice Islands colony).

High Court of the Western Pacific (including the Gilbert and Ellice Islands 1962-1978)

Gilbert Islands (from 1978)

Kiribati (from 1979)

References

External links
 Judiciary Kiribati - Te Bolaki Ni Kabowi

 
Courts in Kiribati
Law of Kiribati